Batán River is a river of Cundinamarca, Colombia. It is a tributary of the Guavio River, that flows into the Cuja River and later into the Sumapaz River. The Sumapaz River flows into the Magdalena River basin, flowing towards the Caribbean Sea.

Description 

The Batán River originates in and flows westward through the municipality Fusagasugá where it flows into the Guavio River.

See also 
 List of rivers of Colombia

References

Further reading 
 Rand McNally, The New International Atlas, 1993.

Rivers of Colombia
Geography of Cundinamarca Department